Senecio candicans, commonly known as angel wings and sea cabbage, is a succulent flowering plant in the Senecio genus that is native to Argentina and is grown as an ornamental plant elsewhere.

Description

Growing up to 1 metre tall, it is a clump-forming plant with broad, serrated and ovate leaves that are silvery-white in colour (similar to Senecio cineraria). It produces flat, terminal clusters of yellow-orange flowers in the summer.

Cultivation
It is grown as an ornamental plant for its showy foliage and drought tolerance as a low hedge for borders and in containers. Growing both indoors and outdoors in full sun or part shade, it is a perennial in USDA zone 8 and above. It can be propagated by cuttings.

References

candicans
Flora of India (region)